Kuti Atal Bihari High School is a secondary school in Kuti, Kasba Upazila, Brahmanbaria District, Bangladesh. It was founded in 1918.

Extracurricular activities 
 BNCC (Bangladesh National Cadet Core)
 Scouting
 Debating
 Picnic
 Social Development

See also 
 Education in Bangladesh
 List of universities and schools in Comilla
 List of schools in Bangladesh

References 

High schools in Bangladesh
Educational institutions established in 1918
1918 establishments in India